WIBW may refer to:
 WIBW (AM), a news and sports talk radio station (580 kHz) licensed to Topeka, Kansas, United States
 WIBW-FM, a country radio station (94.5 MHz FM) licensed to Topeka, Kansas, United States
 WIBW-TV, a television station affiliated with CBS (digital or PSIP channel 13) licensed to Topeka, Kansas, United States